The Two Rivers National Wildlife Refuge is located on the Illinois River and the Mississippi River in parts of Calhoun, Jersey, and Greene counties in Illinois, and St. Charles County, Missouri.  It is managed by the U.S. Fish and Wildlife Service as part of the Mark Twain National Wildlife Refuge Complex.

As of 2009, the Two Rivers National Wildlife Refuge consists of five separate parcels of riverine bottomland wetlands grouped in and around the confluence of the Illinois and the Mississippi Rivers (hence the name, Two Rivers).  The region is noted for its population of bald eagles.

The refuge is 8,501 acres (34 square km) in size.  Its headquarters is located in the Calhoun County municipality of Brussels, Illinois.

References

External links
Official site

Protected areas of Calhoun County, Illinois
Protected areas of Greene County, Illinois
Protected areas of Jersey County, Illinois
National Wildlife Refuges in Illinois
National Wildlife Refuges in Missouri
Protected areas on the Mississippi River
Protected areas of St. Charles County, Missouri
Illinois River
Wetlands of Illinois
Wetlands of Missouri
Landforms of Calhoun County, Illinois
Landforms of Greene County, Illinois
Landforms of Jersey County, Illinois
Landforms of St. Charles County, Missouri
1958 establishments in Illinois
1958 establishments in Missouri
Protected areas established in 1958